Uroš Milosavljević (Serbian Cyrillic: Уpoш Mилocaвљeвић ; born July 13, 1982 in Pančevo) is a Serbian former football player.

External links
 
 
 Profile at Srbijafudbal.

1982 births
Living people
Sportspeople from Pančevo
Serbian footballers
Serbian expatriate footballers
FK Dinamo Pančevo players
OFK Beograd players
FK Vojvodina players
FC Metalurh Zaporizhzhia players
FC Volyn Lutsk players
FC Gloria Buzău players
FC CFR Timișoara players
FC UTA Arad players
Expatriate footballers in Romania
Expatriate footballers in Ukraine
Liga I players
Liga II players
FK Hajduk Kula players
Serbian SuperLiga players
FC Taraz players
FC Bunyodkor players
Ukrainian Premier League players
Association football midfielders
FC Zvezda Irkutsk players